This list is of the Places of Scenic Beauty of Japan located within the Prefecture of Mie.

National Places of Scenic Beauty
As of 1 July 2020, nine Places have been designated at a national level (including one *Special Place of Scenic Beauty); Dorohatchō spans the prefectural borders with Wakayama and Nara.

Prefectural Places of Scenic Beauty
As of 1 May 2019, thirteen Places have been designated at a prefectural level.

Municipal Places of Scenic Beauty
As of 1 May 2019, twelve Places have been designated at a municipal level.

Registered Places of Scenic Beauty
As of 1 July 2020, one Monument has been registered (as opposed to designated) as a Place of Scenic Beauty at a national level.

See also
 Cultural Properties of Japan
 List of parks and gardens of Mie Prefecture
 List of Historic Sites of Japan (Mie)
 List of Cultural Properties of Japan - paintings (Mie)

References

External links
  Cultural Properties of Mie Prefecture
  Places of Scenic Beauty of Mie Prefecture

Tourist attractions in Mie Prefecture
Places of Scenic Beauty